Tony Choy (born June 11, 1971) is a Cuban-American electric bassist. He was a session musician for some well-known technical death metal bands such as Atheist, Cynic and the Dutch band Pestilence.  He is known for his use of the Slap & Pop playing technique, along with two-handed tapping.

He was also the founding  member of the Grammy nominated Latin pop group named Area 305.

Discography 
 Cynic – "Demo 1990" (1990)
 Cynic – "Roadrunner demo" (1991)
 Atheist – Unquestionable Presence (1991)
 Pestilence – Testimony of the Ancients (1991)
 Atheist – Elements (1993)
 Juan Gabriel – "Por Los Siglos" (2001)
 Area 305 – "Area 305" (2002)
 Area 305 – "Hay Que Cambiar" (2004)
 C-187 – "Collision" (2007)
 Pestilence – Resurrection Macabre (2009)
 Atheist – "Unquestionable Presence: Live At Wacken" (2009)
 Area 305 – "Versión 2.0" (2010)

References 

1971 births
Living people
American heavy metal bass guitarists
American male bass guitarists
Death metal musicians
Cuban emigrants to the United States
Progressive metal bass guitarists
Pestilence (band) members
Cynic (band) members
21st-century American bass guitarists
21st-century American male musicians